Igor Vladimirovich Shinkarenko (born 18 June 1956) is a Russian professional football manager and former player.

He is also the father of Aleksandr Shinkarenko.

External links
 

1956 births
Living people
Soviet footballers
Soviet football managers
FC Mordovia Saransk managers
Russian football managers
FC KAMAZ Naberezhnye Chelny managers
Association footballers not categorized by position
People from Nikolayevsk-on-Amur
Sportspeople from Khabarovsk Krai